Serhiy Kravchenko (born 7 October 1956) is a Ukrainian football coach and a former player.

Personal life
His sons are Ukrainian former football player and current football coach Serhiy Kravchenko and Ukrainian racecar driver Andriy Kravchenko.

References

External links
 

1956 births
Living people
People from Ussuriysk
Soviet footballers
Ukrainian footballers
FC Shakhtar Donetsk players
FC SKA Rostov-on-Don players
FC Elektrometalurh-NZF Nikopol players
FC Shakhtar Horlivka players
Ukrainian expatriate footballers
Expatriate footballers in Czechoslovakia
FC Tyumen players
FC Metalurh Zaporizhzhia players
FC Shakhtar Shakhtarsk players
FC Kremin Kremenchuk players
FC Shakhtar Snizhne players
Ukrainian football managers
Association football forwards
FC Metalurh-2 Donetsk managers